Japan participated in the 2010 Asian Games in Guangzhou, China, on 12–27 November 2010.

Handball

Men's tournament
Team
Katsuyuki ShinouchiKenji ToyodaMakoto SuematsuHideyuki MurakamiDaisuke MiyazakiToru TakedaSatoshi FujitaHidenori KishigawaMorihide KaidoToshihiro TsuboneKyosuke TomitaJun MoriMasayuki MatsumuraYoshiaki NomuraTetsuya KadoyamaShusaku Higashinagahama

Preliminary round

Group A

Semifinals

Bronze medal match

Women's tournament
Team
Megumi TakahashiAimi ItoAkie UegakiAkina ShinjoKaori NakamuraShio FujiiKumi MoriKarina MakiHiromi TashiroYuko ArihamaKaoru YokoshimaMayuko IshitateKaori FujimaRika WakamatsuAiko HayafuneSayo Shiota

Preliminary round

Group B

Semifinals

Gold medal match

Field hockey

Men's tournament
Team
Yoshihiro AnaiManabu HatakeyamaKei KawakamiKoji KazukawaKenji KitazatoGenki MitaniTakayasu MizawaShunsuke NagaokaKatsuyoshi NagasawaTomonori OnoKazuyuki OzawaHiroki SakamotoNaoto ShiokawaKatsuya TakaseKazuhiro TsubouchiTakahiko Yamabori

Preliminary

Group B

Classification 5th–8th

Classification 5th–6th

Women's tournament
Team
Sakiyo AsanoKeiko MiuraAkemi KatoAi MurakamiMiyuki NakagawaKeiko ManabeYukari YamamotoMie NakashimaRika KomazawaKaori ChibaNagisa HayashiMazuki AraiKana NagayamaMayumi OnoAki MitsuhashiShiho Otsuka

Preliminary round

Bronze medal game

Judo

Men

* Shokir Muminov of Uzbekistan originally won the silver medal, but was disqualified after he tested positive for Methylhexanamine. Masahiro Takamatsu and Islam Bozbayev were raised to joint second and took silver medals.

Women

Kabaddi

Men's tournament
Team
Kokei ItoYoji KawaiRyokei KushigeKazuaki MurakamiRyota NakajimaTaiki NamaTerukazu NittaMasayuki OhtaMasayuki ShimokawaHiromi TakahashiKazuhiro TakanoYudai Yamagishi

Preliminary round

Group B

Semifinals

Karate

Men

Women

Modern pentathlon

Men

Women

Roller sports

Women

Artistic

Rowing

Men

Women

Rugby

Men's tournament
Team
Koji WadaYasunori NagatomoMasahiro TsuikiKotaro WatanabeYuta ImamuraShuetsu NaritaHiraku TomoigawaTakehisa UsuzukiTomohiro SembaKenji ShomenTakayuki YamauchiTomoki Kitagawa

Preliminary round

Pool A

Quarterfinals

Semifinals

Gold medal match

Women's tournament
Team
Akari FujisakiChikami InoueKeiko KatoAnri KawanoKana MitsugiMami OkadaAyaka SusukiMisaki SusukiAyako TanakaMakiko TomitaMarie YamaguchiRinako Yokoyama

Preliminary round

Pool B

Quarterfinals

5–8 placing

5th/6th placing

References

Nations at the 2010 Asian Games
2010
Asian Games